Managuli Mallappa Channaveerappa (died 28 January 2021) was an Indian politician.

From 2018 till 2021, he served as a member of the Karnataka Legislative Assembly, representing the seat of Sindagi for the Janata Dal (Secular).

Channaveerappa died of respiratory complications from COVID-19 in 2021 at the age of 85.

References

1930s births
2021 deaths
Janata Dal (Secular) politicians
Deaths from the COVID-19 pandemic in India
Karnataka MLAs 2018–2023
Karnataka MLAs 1994–1999
People from Bijapur district, Karnataka
Year of birth unknown